Lawson Bekui (born 12 August 1994) is a Ghanaian professional footballer who plays as a forward for Al-Entesar.

Career
On 1 March 2019, Bekui joined Finnish club AC Kajaani on loan from Dhofar Club. On 9 September 2019, he then left the club and was loaned out to Muscat Club instead.

On 7 February 2023, Bekui joined Al-Entesar.

Honours
Dhofar Club
Oman League: 2016–17
Oman Super Cup: 2017

References

External links

1994 births
Living people
Footballers from Accra
Ghanaian footballers
Ghanaian expatriate footballers
Association football forwards
Liga Portugal 2 players
Ykkönen players
Liga I players
Ghana Premier League players
Oman Professional League players
Saudi First Division League players
Saudi Second Division players
Extremadura UD B players
FC Politehnica Iași (2010) players
Dhofar Club players
AC Kajaani players
Muscat Club players
Al-Sahel SC (Saudi Arabia) players
Al-Entesar Club players
Ghanaian expatriate sportspeople in Romania
Ghanaian expatriate sportspeople in Bulgaria
Ghanaian expatriate sportspeople in Oman
Ghanaian expatriate sportspeople in Finland
Ghanaian expatriate sportspeople in Saudi Arabia
Expatriate footballers in Romania
Expatriate footballers in Bulgaria
Expatriate footballers in Oman
Expatriate footballers in Finland
Expatriate footballers in Saudi Arabia